Letourneur & Marchand, located in the prosperous Paris suburb Neuilly-sur-Seine, was a car body manufacturing business which became one of the last French coachbuilders.

Origins and growth 1905 - 1939 
The company was founded by Jean-Marie Letourneur and Jean-Arthur Marchand in 1905, and by the 1930s was specialising in coachbuilt car bodies for fitting on chassis from luxury automakers such as Duesenberg, Hispano-Suiza, Rolls-Royce and Minerva.

In 1924 the company created a subsidiary called Autobineau to specialise in sedan and limousine car bodies produced in marginally greater volumes and in a slightly more standardised format than was associated with the upmarket coach builders. During the 1920s Letourneur et Marchand became the main supplier of car bodies for Delage.  The business also built bodies for manufacturers such as Unic.  In 1936, Delage introduced their D8-120 chassis, which formed the basis for the Aérosport, manufactured between 1936 and 1939.

Decline and demise 1945 - 1960 
After the war, Letourneur et Marchand found themselves one of numerous auto-businesses far too small to feature significantly in the government's vision for an export led French auto-industry dominated by a handful of large manufacturers.   Between 1947 and 1952 the company produced only 67 car bodies, equivalent to about one car per month.   Immediate financial collapse was averted in 1953 thanks to a contract signed with Renault for the production of a cabriolet version of the Renault Frégate which had been homologated with the authorities and could be sold and serviced through one of France's largest dealership networks.   Unfortunately the Frégate itself had got off to a slow start in the market place, being beset by teething problems and reliability issues, and although sources indicate that during the second half of the decade it became a much more dependable vehicle, in terms of sales volumes it was hopelessly out competed by the Simca Vedette and the Citroën DS.   The Frégate struggled on till 1960 when it was withdrawn without direct replacement, and during this time 70 Letourneur et Marchand cabriolet variants were produced.  The final batch of Frégate cabriolets featured an eye catching two tone paint scheme, coloured either "black and ivory" or "black and turquoise".

Letourneur & Marchand collapsed in 1960 following the discontinuation of their cabriolet version of the Renault Frégate.

External links 
www.coachbuild.com, Letourneur et Marchand. 
www.ultimatecarpage.com, om Letourneur et Marchand.

References and sources 

 La carrosserie française, du style au design, par Serge Bellu, éditions E.T.A.I., 2007. 

Coachbuilders of France